WCBS (880 AM, "WCBS Newsradio 880") is a radio station licensed to New York, New York and is owned and operated by Audacy, Inc. WCBS's studios are located in the combined Audacy facility in the Hudson Square neighborhood of lower Manhattan and its transmitter is located on High Island in the Bronx. Its 50,000-watt clear channel signal can be heard at night throughout much of the eastern United States and Canada.

History

Before the news
The station's history traces back to 1924, when Alfred H. Grebe started WAHG at 920 AM. WAHG was a pioneering station in New York, and was one of the first commercial radio stations to broadcast from remote locations including horse races and yachting events. Two years later, in 1926, Alfred Grebe changed the station's call sign to WABC (for his Atlantic Broadcasting Company) after concluding a business arrangement with the Ashland Battery Company (which had owned the call sign for a station in Asheville, North Carolina) and moved his studios to West 57th Street, which would not be the last time the station would operate from 57th Street.

In 1928, General Order 40 moved the station's frequency to 970, and the station became a part-time affiliate of the Columbia Broadcasting System, which was looking for a full-time radio presence in New York City (CBS's first flagship was WOR). After a short time broadcasting CBS programming three days a week, CBS president William S. Paley purchased WABC and it became a subsidiary of CBS.

Soon after this purchase the station moved to a new frequency, this time to 860, and would eventually increase its transmitting power from 5,000 to its present 50,000 watts. The station also moved its studios into the CBS headquarters at 485 Madison Avenue (on the corner of 52nd Street). The station, still operating as WABC, featured a mix of local interest programming, ethnic content and music programs from CBS's national feed. As time went by, WABC turned more and more to the national programming provided by CBS and its affiliates, and its broadcast day was influenced by CBS's growing interest in news programming. In 1939, the broadcasting operations were moved across 52nd Street from the headquarters to the new CBS Studio Building.

In 1941, WABC moved to the radio frequency it currently occupies, 880, and changed its call letters to WCBS on November 2, 1946, to identify more closely with its parent network, the Columbia Broadcasting System or CBS, and avoid possible confusion with the rival network of the American Broadcasting Company (ABC), which had begun operation in 1943. As a result, this station has no relation to the longtime ABC radio flagship station on 770 that began in 1921 as WJZ, and has operated as WABC since 1953.

Over the next 20 years WCBS developed a series of radio soap operas, afternoon talk shows and an all night easy listening music show, Music 'til Dawn hosted by Bob Hall and sponsored by American Airlines. During this time WCBS featured well-known personalities including Arthur Godfrey, future CBS News President Bill Leonard, author Emily Kimbrough and folk singer Oscar Brand.

Fear on Trial
One controversy involving WCBS emerged in the 1950s. One of its daytime hosts, John Henry Faulk, was part of an anti-blacklisting wing (including  CBS newsman Charles Collingwood) that took over leadership of the flagship New York chapter of the broadcasters' union AFTRA.

After Faulk and WCBS came under pressure from anti-Communist group Aware, Inc., Faulk and attorney Louis Nizer sued Aware, Inc. for libel, a case often considered one of the key turning points in the battle against McCarthyism. Faulk was supported by fellow CBS broadcaster Edward R. Murrow, who was tipped off to Faulk's plight by Carl Sandburg. According to Murrow biographer Joe Persico, Murrow gave Faulk the money he needed to retain Nizer as his lawyer. Faulk finally won the case in 1963, in the meantime becoming a popular radio personality in his native Texas, and later, a national television personality as a regular in the cast of the country music/humor variety show Hee Haw.

WCBS fired Faulk because of declining ratings while he waited for the case to come to trial, but Stanley Cloud and Lynne Olson's book The Murrow Boys asserted that WCBS executive Arthur Hull Hayes admitted on the stand the station's overall ratings, not Faulk's specifically, had slipped.

The controversy became the subject of the 1975 CBS television movie Fear on Trial, based in part on Faulk's autobiography of the same name.

Time announcement
Since 1924, WCBS has been known for announcing the time consistently every three minutes. This is because during the early 20th century, not all listeners had reliable time pieces. They relied on synchronising their clocks up with the radio almost every day. To this day, WCBS announces the time frequently. On the hour, WCBS plays the iconic and distinctive CBS network "bong" indicating that the time is on the hour (although the station now broadcasts with a 10-second delay). The time is distinctly introduced with "WCBS news time: _:__". This standard practice, with slight variations, is also used at other CBS-affiliated news radio stations nationwide.

Now, the news

By the late 1950s and early 1960s, WCBS evolved into a middle of the road (MOR) music and personality format, which included limited talk programming. Personalities included morning host Jack Sterling, Bill Randle and Lee Jordan. Like many MOR stations at the time, WCBS did mix in softer songs by rock-and-roll artists. Its ratings at the time were ordinary compared to the higher ratings at WOR and WNEW, both of which also had MOR formats and more distinct identities. Through it all, the variety show Arthur Godfrey Time remained a weekday mid-morning staple. Eventually, WCBS gained a foothold in local news coverage (WOR and WNEW's strengths) bolstered by its standing as CBS's flagship radio station.

During the 1960s, CBS chairman William S. Paley was concerned about the station's low ratings, and that concern started a process that led to the creation of a news radio format that would become known as "Newsradio 88". Paley hired Clark B. George, then vice-president and general manager of WCBS-TV, to create the new format and turn the station's low ratings around. The format debuted on August 28, 1967 – although on WCBS-FM, because a small airplane had crashed into and destroyed WCBS's AM antenna tower just a few hours earlier. Its original roster of anchors included Charles Osgood, Ed Bradley, Robert Vaughn and Pat Summerall. Later anchors included veteran newscaster Lou Adler, Jim Donnelly, Harvey Hauptman, Bill Lynch and Gary Maurer.

Initially, the station ran news in the drive time periods but maintained an MOR format during the midday and overnight hours, and within a couple of years, it ran all-news programming for much of the broadcast day except for overnights. "Newsradio 88" began its transformation into an all-news format in 1970, when the overnight American Airlines-sponsored Music Till Dawn ended in January of that year, and completed the process in 1972, when Godfrey's weekday morning variety show came to an end. The station built a reputation as an all-news powerhouse during the 1970s, and has continued with an all-news format to this day.

Although WINS has usually received the higher Arbitron ratings of the two all-news stations, WCBS has had the better ratings in the suburbs because of its stronger, non-directional signal, unlike WINS' directional pattern. Its traffic reports and news coverage includes more of Long Island and Westchester County than WINS, and it occasionally allows room for longer interviews and analysis pieces than does WINS. The station is less tightly formatted than WINS, and formats at a half-hour cycle instead of a 20-minute cycle. Also unlike WINS, WCBS does not change anchors every thirty minutes during its daily schedule. Instead, each solo anchor or anchor team on weekdays has a set shift from 5a.m. until 8p.m., with two anchors switching every one or two hours after that.  On weekends, anchors also alternate every hour.

In October 2000, WCBS made another physical move, this time from CBS corporate headquarters at 51 West 52nd Street (the building known as "Black Rock") to the CBS Broadcast Center at 524 West 57th Street. Around this time, the station began referring to itself on air as "Newsradio 880". On December 2, 2011, the station moved its operations again to 345 Hudson Street, known as the Hudson Square Broadcast Center, sharing space with CBS Radio's other New York stations.

On February 2, 2017, CBS agreed to merge CBS Radio with Entercom, currently the fourth-largest radio broadcaster in the United States; the sale was conducted using a Reverse Morris Trust so that it would be tax-free. While CBS shareholders retained a 72% ownership stake in the combined company, Entercom was the surviving entity, separating WCBS radio (both 880 and FM 101.1) from WCBS-TV. The merger was approved on November 9, 2017, and was consummated on November 17. As part of the agreement with CBS, Entercom was given the rights to use the brand and trademarks for WCBS along with sister stations WCBS-FM, KCBS (AM) in San Francisco and KCBS-FM in Los Angeles for a 20 year period after which Entercom (or succeeding entity) will be required to relinquish using those call-letters.

On October 10, 2022, after Audacy had reached a new deal with SAG-AFTRA, it was announced that the separate staffs and newsrooms of WCBS and WINS would be combined (concurrently also announcing the flip of sister station WNYL (92.3 FM) into an FM simulcast of WINS).

"Traffic and Weather Together"
For years, WCBS has sold the fact that it pairs its traffic and weather reports every ten minutes ("on the eights"), and has used the tagline "Traffic and Weather Together" to promote this. The station's chief meteorologist, Craig Allen, and its rush hour traffic reporter Tom Kaminski, have both been with WCBS for over three decades and recorded a series of commercials together to that effect. WCBS part-time meteorologist Todd Glickman, who fills in for Craig, has been with the station since 1979.

WCBS's promotional work was the inspiration for the title of the Fountains of Wayne album Traffic and Weather, according to an interview the New Jersey-based band gave to the station.

Influence
WCBS's switch to all-news was directly spurred by the switch of WINS to a similar format in April 1965. It was also the first move in CBS Radio's long-term plans to convert its group of AM stations – along with WCBS, the group was then composed of KNX in Los Angeles; WBBM in Chicago; WCAU in Philadelphia; KMOX in St. Louis; WEEI in Boston; and KCBS in San Francisco – to some form of news programming. Once WCBS had been established in the format, CBS began to work on the rest of its AM outlets. KCBS, KNX and WBBM all transitioned in 1968. WEEI adopted an all-news format in 1974, and WCAU made the switch a year later. The programming shift was a gradual one just as it had been at WCBS, with the stations running all-news most of the day while some local and network non-news programming remained at first. KMOX, which had been programming a talk radio format for several years was left unaffected, though it would later evolve into a news/talk station.

In Boston, Chicago and San Francisco, CBS-owned stations had a monopoly on the all-news format. But in New York, Los Angeles and Philadelphia, CBS had to compete with Westinghouse-owned stations (WINS, KFWB and KYW, respectively) which had adopted all-news programming before the CBS stations did. While the Los Angeles stations made the switch within days of each other, WCAU in Philadelphia did not switch to the format until 1975, giving KYW a ten-year head start with the audience. Many blame this as the primary reason WCAU did not succeed in competing with KYW; the all-news format on WCAU lasted only three years. In contrast, the other CBS all-news stations experienced success and stability with the format. In 1995, Westinghouse merged with CBS, making WCBS a sister station to its longtime archrival WINS.

Before the merger with Entercom, CBS Radio operated eight of the country's largest all-news radio stations: WCBS, WINS, KNX, WBBM, KYW, WBZ in Boston, WWJ in Detroit and KRLD in Dallas. (As part of the Entercom transaction, and to gain regulatory approval of it, WBZ, along with several other Entercom stations, were sold to iHeartMedia effective December 19, 2017.)

Sports
In 2019 WCBS became the new flagship station for MLB's New York Mets, succeeding WOR in that capacity. For several years prior, WCBS had served as the primary overflow outlet for sister station WFAN-AM-FM's coverage of the NFL's New York Giants, the NBA's Brooklyn Nets, and the NHL's New Jersey Devils. When the Mets moved to WCBS, Entercom allowed WFAN to split its AM and FM feeds to accommodate such conflicts—WFAN also broadcasts New York Yankees baseball, which it acquired from WCBS in 2014. The station continues to offer continuous news coverage on its web feed when sports events cannot be streamed due to NFL and NBA restrictions. (MLB allowed its local radio partners to stream games once again in 2019 after several years of exclusivity via MLB.com. There are no NHL radio blackouts.) In 2022, the WCBS Audacy stream began to carry Mets broadcasts within the team's broadcast territory. Later that year, the station became the flagship for Rutgers Scarlet Knights men's basketball, replacing longtime home WOR.

WCBS has served three stints as the radio flagship of the Yankees, with the most recent running from 2002 until 2013. The station had previously carried the Yankees from 1939 to 1940 (when the outlet was known as WABC); and from 1960 to 1966, a period that included a time in which the team was owned by CBS Inc., which purchased a majority interest in the Yankees in 1964. The broadcaster sold the club to a group led by George Steinbrenner in 1973.

Until WFAN began broadcasting its all-sports format in 1987, WCBS was the primary outlet for CBS Radio Network coverage of professional sports events, including Major League Baseball and the National Football League. It also served as the flagship commercial station for St. John's University basketball games during the Johnnies' renaissance in the 1980s and 1990s. WCBS also served two tenures as the flagship station of the New York Jets. In its pre-all-news days, WCBS also carried the baseball Giants (as part of the 1930s-40s Giants-Yankees home game package), the football Giants, and the NBA's New York Knicks. In 2016, the New York Islanders moved their flagship station to WCBS for that year's playoffs, with WFAN airing select games when available; the Islanders had up to that point resorted to airing on noncommercial WNYE, which had limited the team's ability to earn money from the broadcasts.

WCBS served as a springboard to athletes-turned-broadcasters in its pre-all-news period. Most notably, former football Giants Pat Summerall and Frank Gifford were employed in various capacities by WCBS and the CBS Radio Network late in their playing days. Sports announcer Marty Glickman served as sports director during a time in the 1960s.

Mel Allen was originally renowned as an all-purpose broadcaster on WCBS and the CBS Radio Network before and during his tenure as the Yankees' lead broadcaster. Decades later, Ed Ingles established a 25-year career as sports director and morning sports anchor at WCBS, reporter for the Jets and St. John's broadcasts, and mentor to several veteran local and national broadcasters such as Barry Landers, Bill Schweizer, Spencer Ross and Bill Daughtry.

See also
WCBS-FM (101.1 MHz.)
WCBS-TV (channel 2)

References

External links
 

 
 
 WCBS Historical Profile – 1978
 New York City AM Radio History
 WCBS Newsradio88 Appreciation Site

All-news radio stations in the United States
Radio stations established in 1924
1924 establishments in New York (state)
CBS
Audacy, Inc. radio stations
Hudson Square
Clear-channel radio stations